Tin Shui Wai is an MTR station on the , located in Ping Shan near Tin Shui Wai New Town, Yuen Long District. It is the only heavy rail station serving Tin Shui Wai, which has a population of around 300,000.

History 
On 20 December 2003, Tin Shui Wai station opened to the public along with the other KCR West Rail stations.

Hence, Tin Shui Wai was included in the project and is now an intermediate station on the Tuen Ma line.

Location
It is in the north of Ping Shan and adjacent to Tin Yiu Estate, Tin Shing Court and Tin Yau Court. The station is elevated over the junction of Ping Ha Road and Tin Fuk Road. A public transport interchange is located to the southwest of the station. Three footbridges are constructed along Tin Fuk Road and Ping Ha Road to connect the station to the highly populated urban area that the station is built in.

Station layout

Platforms 1 and 2 share the same island platform.

The first train to Tuen Mun departs at 6:21 a.m., while the last train departs at 12:36 a.m. the day after. The first train to Hung Hom departs at 5:51 a.m., and the last train departs at 12:21 a.m. the day after.

Entrances/exits
 A: Ping Ha Road (South) 
 B: Tin Shing Court 
 C: Tin Yiu Estate 
 D: Tin Yau Court 
 E1: Light Rail Platform 1
 E2: Light Rail Platform 2 
 E3: Light Rail Platform 3

References

MTR stations in the New Territories
West Rail line
Tuen Ma line
Yuen Long District
Former Kowloon–Canton Railway stations
Railway stations in Hong Kong opened in 2003